Lanmuchang is an historic quicksilver mine in Guizhou. Lanmuchang was one mine in a mineral belt in southwestern China that has been exploited for 2,000 years for cinnabar to manufacture the vermilion paint, Chinese red, and red ink and to produce quicksilver. This is the area referred to in historic texts regarding quicksilver as "Kwei-Chau," Kweichow.

References

Mercury mines in China
Geography of Guizhou
History of Guizhou